Phalacrophyto is a genus of parasitic flies in the family Tachinidae. There is one described species in Phalacrophyto, P. sarcophagina.

Distribution
United States.

References

Dexiinae
Diptera of North America
Monotypic Brachycera genera
Tachinidae genera
Taxa named by Charles Henry Tyler Townsend